Arthur Joseph LeBlanc  (born 1943) is the 33rd and current lieutenant governor of Nova Scotia.

Early life and education
Born in West Arichat, Nova Scotia, LeBlanc attended St. Francis Xavier University, in 1964 with a Bachelor of Commerce Degree and also a Bachelor of Laws Degree from Dalhousie University in 1968. He was admitted to the bar in November 1968.

Legal career
Justice LeBlanc practiced law for 25 years, He concentrated his practice in civil litigation. In 1983, Justice LeBlanc was appointed as Queen's Counsel. In 1998, he was appointed as a Justice of the Supreme Court of Nova Scotia on the advice of Prime Minister of Canada Jean Chrétien

As Lieutenant Governor
LeBlanc was appointed Lieutenant Governor of Nova Scotia on June 14, 2017, by Governor General of Canada David Johnston on the Constitutional advice of Prime Minister of Canada Justin Trudeau. LeBlanc was sworn in on June 28, 2017.

Personal life
He is married to Rosemarie Patricia and together they have three sons.

Coat of Arms

References

Acadian people
Canadian King's Counsel
Judges in Nova Scotia
Lawyers in Nova Scotia
Lieutenant Governors of Nova Scotia
People from Richmond County, Nova Scotia
Schulich School of Law alumni
St. Francis Xavier University alumni
21st-century Canadian politicians
1943 births
Living people